Rolf Santesson (1916–2013) was a Swedish lichenologist and university lecturer. He was awarded the Acharius Medal in 1992 for his lifetime contributions to lichenology.

Early life and education
Santesson was born in 1916 in Trollhättan, Sweden. He was already collecting lichens as a student, investigating the lichen flora of the table mountains of Halleberg and Hunneberg near his home. He entered the University of Uppsala in the 1930s to study botany. It was here he met the flamboyant Professor of Plant Ecology and lichen taxonomist Gustaf Einar Du Rietz, with whom he undertook studies on crustose lichens found on shoreline rocks of Swedish lakes. This work led to a lifelong interest in marine lichens. He earned a B.Sc. in 1938, followed by an M.Sc. in 1939.

That same year, joined by zoologist Christian Olrog, Santesson embarked on what was supposed to be an eight-month research excursion in Patagonia (southern South America). Because of the outbreak of war, which made sea travel unsafe, it instead lasted almost two years. Santesson was able to make comprehensive collections with detailed field note-books. Olrog wrote a book in Swedish about their trip called Destination Eldslandet (1943), which tracked the adventures of the expedition. After his return Santesson worked on taxonomic treatments of the material he collected from South America, which resulted in the revision of several genera, including Menegazzia, Cladina, Dolichocarpus, Xanthopeltis, and calicioid lichens. His work on Menegazzia has been called "an important and basic landmark in South American lichenology".

Career
In 1946 he moved to Uppsala, where he worked from 1946 to 1950 as an assistant teacher, and from 1953 to 1958 as associate professor at the University of Uppsala. From 1937 to 1946 he was assistant at the Swedish Museum of Natural History in Stockholm. In 1952, Santesson became a Ph.D., defending a doctoral dissertation on foliicolous lichens.

From 1973 to 1981, Santesson was professor and director of the Botanical Department at Stockholm's Swedish Museum of Natural History. After his retirement in 1982, Santesson continued working at the Botanical Museum in Uppsala, where he researched lichen parasites as well as helped compile several editions of the book series Lichens of Sweden and Norway. Santesson undertook major lichen-collecting expeditions throughout the world, including Europe (British Isles, France, Madeira, Portugal, Switzerland, Spain); North America (United States; Mexico) Tenerife; Iceland; Africa (Kenya and Tanzania); South America (Patagonia; Peru); and Asia (China; Far East of Russia).

Recognition
Santesson has been recognized for his intuitive approach in assessing phylogenetic relationships amongst lichens. As Robert Lücking has noted, "he was the first to predict that species with different ascospores but otherwise similar characters, so-called sporomorphs, form closely related series." Although this concept had been largely neglected by other taxonomists, his theory was validated decades later with the use of molecular phylogenetics in the genus Thelotrema.

Santesson was awarded the Acharius Medal in 1992 for his lifetime contributions to lichenology. He had a Festschrift dedicated to him for his 80th birthday in 1997. He was a member of the Royal Swedish Academy of Sciences and an Honorary Member of the British Lichen Society.

Eponymy
Santesson has had four genera named in his honour:
Rolfidium 
Santessonia 
Santessoniella 
Santessoniolichen 

Many species have been named after Santesson, including the following: Arthonia santessoniana ; Arthonia santessonii ; Ascochyta santessonii ; Bachmanniomyces santessonii ; Capronia santessoniana ; Cecidiomyces santessonii ; Chroodiscus santessonii ; Collema santessonii ; Corticifraga santessonii ; Fellhanera santessonii ; Halecania santessonii ; Hobsonia santessonii ; Karschia santessonii ; Laurera santessonii ; Lecidea santessonii ; Lettauia santessonii ; Micropeltopsis santessonii ; Nectriella santessonii ; Odontotrema santessonii ; Opegrapha santessonii ; Pannaria rolfii ; Pannaria santessonii ; Pannaria santessonii ; Peltula santessonii ; Physcia rolfii ; Porina santessonii ;   Pronectria rolfiana ; Protothelenella santessonii ; Pseudocyphellaria santessonii ; Pyrenidium santessonii ; Rhizocarpon santessonii ; Sticta santessonii ; Stirtonia santessonii ; Taeniolella rolfii ; Taeniolella santessonii ; Thelomma santessonii ; Thelotrema santessonii ; Tremella santessonii ; Tricharia santessoniana ; Tricharia santessonii ; Usnea santessonii ; Verrucaria santessonii ; Vouauxiomyces santessonii ; Xanthoparmelia santessonii ; and Zwackhiomyces rolfii .

Selected publications
Santesson had more than 70 scientific publications. Some of his major works are listed below:

See also
 :Category:Taxa named by Rolf Santesson

References

Cited literature

1916 births
2013 deaths
Acharius Medal recipients
Members of the Royal Swedish Academy of Sciences
Swedish lichenologists
Swedish taxonomists
Uppsala University alumni
Academic staff of Uppsala University
20th-century Swedish people
21st-century Swedish people